Sir James Lowther, 4th Baronet, FRS (1673 – 2 January 1755) was an English landowner, industrialist and Whig politician who sat in the House of Commons for 54 years between 1694 and 1755. His ownership and development of coal mines around Whitehaven in Cumberland gave him substantial revenues, and he was reputed the richest commoner in England.

Early life

Lowther was baptised on 5 August 1673 at St Giles in the Fields, London, the second son of Sir John Lowther, 2nd Baronet and Jane Leigh. Educated privately in London, he attended Queen's College, Oxford and the Middle Temple. On the death of his father in 1706, the baronetcy was inherited by James's elder brother Christopher, but Christopher (whose drinking and gambling had led his father to disinherit him) was cut off with an annuity of about £100 a year and the family properties passed to James, who subsequently inherited the baronetcy in 1731, when his brother died without children.

Politics
In 1694, Lowther was returned as Member of Parliament for Carlisle, a seat he held until 1702. He also served on the Board of Ordnance from 1696 until 1708, when he re-entered Parliament for Cumberland. This seat he held until 1722; in 1723, he was returned for Appleby, but in 1727 was MP for Cumberland again, and would be so for the rest of his life. His unopposed election in 1754 was noted to be "... the fifteenth Time he has been elected to represent us in Parliament, having sat threescore Years in the House of Commons, and being the only Member of the last Parliament, who sat in the Reign of King William."  He was sworn a Privy Counsellor in 1714.  Politically, Lowther was a Whig, but with little interest in national affairs; his Parliamentary activity was primarily directed towards promoting local interests in Cumbria.

Source of wealth

The principal wealth of the estates was in coal mines, in West Cumberland (exporting about 35 thousand tons of coal a year and making a profit of about £1000 a year when James inherited them).  He used this income to extend and improve his holdings in the Cumberland coalfield, and to maintain his position as the dominant coal-owner there. Whitehaven produced most of the coal shipped from West Cumberland (which was largely sold into Ireland), and this made the Lowthers predominant in the coal field; the price of Whitehaven coals at Dublin being set by competition with other coal fields, not with other Cumberland ports such as Workington.  Lowther's father had been worried that this predominance would be lost because of increased production elsewhere in the coal field (for example by the pits in the Workington area owned by the Curwen family) which Whitehaven would be unable to match because workable coal would soon be exhausted, and because of the limited capacity of Whitehaven harbour. On Tyneside, the leading coal-owners protected their profits by a price-setting cartel (the 'Grand Alliance'); Lowther instead adopted other strategies to maintain his dominance.

Sir John Clerk of Penicuik described him in 1739 as "an indolent old man, and knows nothing about coal works but in order to grow rich carried them on by the best advice and seems indeed to be very well served" but the context of the remark is that Clerk was planning (and gathering material for) a learned dissertation on coal-mining   Lowther's principal residence was in London, and the success of his efforts did depend largely on his choice of able subordinates, most notably the Spedding brothers (John and Carlisle), but he kept up an extensive and detailed correspondence with them and travelled to Whitehaven (where Clerk of Penicuik met him in August 1739) most summers.  Under Lowther, the pits at Whitehaven more than trebled their annual output of coal; their profits increased more than sixfold.

The Spedding brothers
John Spedding (1685–1758) was first employed by Lowther's father, apparently to assist with the accounts. In his will Sir John bequeathed two years' salary (£20) to Spedding, and commended him to James. Spedding's adverse reports on the accounts of the colliery manager (John Gale, relative of the Speddings) led to Gale's dismissal (1707) and the discovery of embezzlement by him. John became colliery manager in his stead.  It had been intended that John's younger brother, Carlisle Spedding, should go to sea with one of Gale's sons, but this now fell through, and Carlisle was instead employed as a subordinate to his brother. (It is said that Carlisle was sent to Tyneside to work as a hewer (under an assumed name) to see how things were done there, his true identity only being revealed by his getting expensive medical treatment after being hurt in an explosion. However the story first appeared in print a generation after Carlisle Spedding's death, and one modern writer doubts it, finding no evidence for it in the Lowther accounts, and seeing no reason for subterfuge since Tyneside and Cumberland sold their coal into different markets.) John was promoted to steward (in conjunction with Richard Gilpin 1722-30: on his own after 1730); he also entered into business on his own account, backed by Lowther's money and uncertainty as to when he was acting for himself, and when to further some scheme of his employer's was helpful to both parties.  Carlisle's innovations in the Lowther mines at Whitehaven earned him a national reputation as a mining engineer; he succeeded his brother as colliery manager in 1730.

Acquisitions in West Cumberland
Between 1709 and 1754, over £46,000 was spent to extend Lowther holdings of land and coal royalties in West Cumberland. The intention was to destroy his local competitors and establish a local monopoly; he failed to offer others high enough purchase prices to secure the properties needed for a monopoly, but by the 1740s Lowther was the dominant exporter at every harbour in the coalfield. Loans were made to local landowners in the hope that interest payments would not be met and Lowther would be able to foreclose on the property. Mine-owners at Moresby and Distington were bought out. Repeated attempts were made (through John Spedding and other third parties) to lease the pits at Workington owned by the Curwen family, but came to nothing. However, a lease (in conjunction with a junior partner) was secured (1731) of Seaton colliery, which Spedding regarded as the greatest obstacle to Lowther domination of the coalfield, and in 1734, the lessees of Clifton colliery agreed to limit their export sales to 7000 tons a year, to be sold to the lessees of Seaton colliery; an agreement which – Spedding assured Lowther – must put the coal trade through Workington harbour entirely in his hands. The junior partner in the Seaton lease later fell out with Lowther and Spedding, and alleged that Seaton was deliberately being run inefficiently to stifle competition with the Whitehaven pits.
A lease of the coal royalties owned by St Bees School (of which both Sir James and John Spedding were governors) was obtained (1742) on manifestly unfair terms.

Improvements

Draining mines by steam-driven pumps
The Lowther coal mines at Whitehaven inherited by James were on the eastern edge of high ground to the west of the town (what was later known as the Howgill colliery) and worked seams which dipped westward at a gradient of about 10%. The distance to which the seams could be followed using gravity drainage by adits was therefore considerable, but limited. To continue mining without the pits flooding, Sir John had had to use horse-powered gins to raise water mechanically, but this was expensive (and increasingly so as the seams were followed deeper): Sir John, and after him James, had concerns that there were little more reserves of economically retrievable coal. In 1712 John Spedding urged Lowther to consider the adoption of pumping by steam, by "Captain Savory's invention", but nothing seems to have come of this until in 1715 Lowther discussed the problem of recovering a flooded pit with Thomas Newcomen. Newcomen submitted proposals in October 1715, which Spedding found clear and businesslike; from them he concluded that a Newcomen engine would recover the pit in two-thirds the time that horse gins would take, and would do so at a quarter of the cost. A contract was signed (November 1715) for a small (17-inch diameter cylinder) Newcomen engine to be erected and leased from the consortium holding Savery's patent for £182 a year. Despite numerous teething problems, the engine (and the pumps it operated) proved a success and in February 1727 after ten years operation Lowther bought the engine (and the right to operate it) outright for £200 and paid another £350 for a license to build and operate another (slightly larger) one. About this time, Lowther commented to John Spedding
"We have been very successful from first to last in the timing of things about the Fire Engine, which I should hardly have ventured upon if I had not mett with such a very honest good man as Mr. Newcomen who I believe would not wrong anybody to gain ever so much". Horses were still used to haul coal, and for winding of coal and men.

Working coal under the sea – Saltom pit

Lowther then exploited the greater ease with which water ingress could be coped with by sinking a pit at the western edge of the Howgill colliery, close to the sea shore at Saltom. Work began early in 1730, and the pit was officially opened in May 1732 with great celebration (an ox-roast in the street; a public dinner for the Justices of the Peace and the principal inhabitants (with many toasts...)). The Newcastle Courant thought the celebrations fully justified; because of the scale of the undertaking ('the Attempt being generous and great': a shaft twelve foot by ten had been sunk seventy-seven fathoms (the deepest a pit had been sunk in any part of Europe) to a three-yard thick coal seam (the Main Band) in twenty-three months, using thirty barrels of gunpowder, and without any loss of life or limb by the workforce); because of the difficulties overcome ( which "would have discourag'd all common Undertakers" (a "blower" of firedamp had been encountered at forty-two fathoms) but had been overcome by the 'unparallel'd Conduct and Skill of Sir James Lowther's Managers, Messieurs John and Carlisle Spedding'); but above all 'The perfecting of this costly Undertaking renders a universal Joy to the Inhabitants...; because the consequence is such as makes certain a valuable Colliery for many Generations'.

Further improvements proved necessary; attempts to ship coal directly from Saltom were unsuccessful, and an underground roadway was driven to the bottom of another pit, from whose pithead a waggonway ran to Whitehaven harbour. The pumping engine originally installed at Saltom proved inadequate, and by 1739 two much larger ones were in use.  But Saltom pit allowed the working of much coal inaccessible from previous pits; by 1765, workings extended a mile and a half from the shaft and as much as three-quarters of a mile out to sea.   Clerk of Penicuik (who thought it folly to have assumed the ingress of sea water would be manageable) commented:

At Whitehaven I took notice that Sir Ja. Louder, by the meer force of money, was working a field of Coal under the sea, which neither he nor any man else had ever attempted but from ignorance and a vast store of Richess.

Lowther had spent on a scale beyond other Cumbrian coal-owners (and beyond most other coal-owners elsewhere in Britain) – £1900 had been invested before any significant amount of coal was raised, and it took over £4,500 to get the pit into full production. But the expenditure was rewarded: by 1752 over a quarter of a million tons had been extracted and sold at a profit of over a shilling a ton; Saltom pit continued to be worked until 1848.

Dealing with firedamp
The blower encountered in sinking Saltom pit was described to the Royal Society by Lowther, who sought suggestions on how to deal with firedamp in his pits. A major release had taken place on breaking through a layer of black stone into one of the higher coal seams. Ignited with a candle, it had given a steady flame "about half a Yard in Diameter, and near two Yards high" The flame being extinguished, and a wider penetration through the black stone made, re-ignition of the gas gave a bigger flame, a yard in diameter and about three yards high which was only extinguished with difficulty. The blower was panelled off from the shaft, and piped to the surface where over two and a half years later it continued as fast as ever, filling a large bladder in a few seconds. The Society members elected Sir James a Fellow, but were unable to come up with any solution, or improve on the assertion (eventually found to be incorrect) of Carlisle Spedding, the paper's author, that "this sort of Vapour, or damp Air, will not take Fire except by Flame; Sparks do not affect it, and for that Reason it is frequent to use Flint and Steel in Places affected with this sort of Damp, which will give a glimmering Light, that is a great Help to the Workmen in difficult Cases."
 Spedding invented a "steel mill", in which a flint was held against a rapidly rotated steel disc, producing a stream of sparks giving some illumination. A second worker was needed to operate the mill, since the disc was rotated by a hand crank, and its operation was tiring. The use of the mill as a safer alternative to naked flame spread to other coalfields; prior to the introduction of the Davy lamp, up to a hundred steel mills were in daily use at one Tyneside colliery despite a fatal firedamp explosion at Wallsend colliery in 1785 ignited by a steel mill.

Spedding also introduced the practice of "coursing the air". As in other pits, the working areas were ventilated by fresh air, drawn down one half of a partitioned shaft; the air was then exhausted up the other half of the shaft, the air circulation being driven by a furnace at the base of the return half of the shaft: wooden partitioning and doors were used to prevent short-circuiting between feed and exhaust flows within the mine. Spedding improved this by ensuring that after ventilating areas currently being worked the exhaust stream was routed through previously worked areas to eliminate any possibility of firedamp accumulation in unventilated volumes. This practice also spread from the Lowther pits to become standard practice in other coalfields.

Lowther also supported experimental work on firedamp by William Brownrigg, a local doctor (and a son of the local gentry; in due course he married a Spedding daughter) and presented papers by Brownrigg at the Royal Society. Brownrigg was elected an FRS, but his papers on the subject were held back by him from publication (he is said to have intended a History of Coal Mining), and have now been lost.

Harbours

Sir John had developed Whitehaven as a port for the export of his coal, and had opposed and obstructed the development of a rival harbour at Parton, little more than a mile to the north. James was used by his father to organise opposition in Parliament (1705-6) to a private bill brought in by Thomas Lamplugh, MP for Cockermouth, to allow repair of the facilities at Parton, but Sir John died as the Bill came before committee; James was called away to bury his father and take over the estates, and Lamplugh got his Act. This set up a committee of trustees to run the port, and gave them powers to build between the high and low water marks (over which Lowther otherwise would have had jurisdiction), and to levy tolls on coals loaded at the port.

In 1709, James obtained an Act to improve Whitehaven harbour, and collect tolls (on cargoes: for example ½d a ton 
of coal) and anchorage dues (on ships:2d a ton (displacement) on ships arriving from a British or Irish port, 4d a ton on those arriving from Europe, and 8d a ton for those arriving from further afield) to pay for the improvements. The charges were to be reduced to a third after fourteen years, but a further Act of 1711 deferred the reduction for another fourteen years, and authorised the borrowing of £1350 (against future revenue) to complete the improvements. The harbour was to be run by a committee of twenty-one trustees. Seven of the trustees were to be nominated by Lowther and to hold the position at his pleasure; the other fourteen were to be elected by the traders using the port.  The trustees were also entrusted with the cleansing, paving, and sewerage of the town of Whitehaven, and empowered to levy domestic rates to pay for this. During Lowther's lifetime, the harbour was deepened, and a new outer harbour built, considerably increasing the port capacity. Land transport to the harbour from the main Whitehaven pits was improved by the introduction of waggonways and the need for coal to be loaded into sacks at the pithead removed by a new staith at the harbour: "In this staith are fixed five hurries or spouts, at such a distance from each other that a ship of three hundred tons burthen can be under each hurry and receive a loading at one time. The staith is about thirty-seven feet above the level of the quay, and when the waggons arrive there the bottom of each waggon is drawn out and the coals are dropped from there into the hurry or spout under it, through which they run down into the ship laid below to receive her loading". The staith also contained storage for three thousand waggon loads (six thousand tons Dublin measure).

Parton had not proved a serious competitor to Whitehaven (it was more difficult to access, and the coal brought to it was of lower quality), but it had been used by Lowther to export coal from pits he had bought in Moresby and Distington. Lamplugh did not keep the pier in good repair, and in 1718 it collapsed in a storm, blocking access to the harbour.  Not until 1724 (after Lamplugh had sold his local interests to John Brougham) was any attempt made to re-open Parton. A fresh Act of Parliament was obtained by Lowther setting up a new committee of trustees (including Lowther, both his stewards, and a number of relatives and adherents) authorised to borrow up to £2000 to carry out repairs against future cargo tolls. Lowther and Brougham each lent half the money needed and Parton harbour was back in operation by the end of 1726.  Lowther's continued acquisition of pits, manors and mineral rights in the area included the purchase (1737) of Brougham's interest in Parton harbour (for just over £2,000): henceforth Parton was also a Lowther harbour, but subordinate to Whitehaven.

General

Wealth and frugal lifestyle
By the 1730s Lowther was reputed to be the richest commoner in England, enjoying an income of about £25,000 a year at his death. He was a Governor of St Thomas' Hospital and a founding Governor of the Foundling Hospital, and the principal contributor to the construction and endowment of two new churches in Whitehaven. His own lifestyle was frugal, which earned him a reputation for parsimony and the soubriquet of "Farthing Jemmy", After his death, anecdotes appeared suggesting him to be both penny-wise:
  
Sir James Lowther, after changing a piece of silver in George's Coffee House, and paying twopence for his dish of coffee, was helped into his chariot (for he was then very old and infirm), and went home; some little time after he returned to the same coffee house on purpose to acquaint the woman who kept it that she had given him a bad halfpenny, and demanded another in exchange for it. Sir James had about forty thousand pounds per annum, and was at a loss whom to appoint his heir.
and pound-foolish:

We are informed, from Whitehaven, that Sir William Lowther, Bart. Gave all the Wearing Apparel of the late Sir James Lowther among Sir James' Servants; and that one of them having found several Papers pinned under the Sleeve of the coat which had fallen to his Share, took them to Sir William, and said, he apprehended they were not designed for him as any Part of the Present, and therefore he thought it his Duty to return them.  Since when, Sir William has settled £50 a year on him for Life, as a Reward for his Honesty.- 'Tis said the Papers were Bank Notes worth £10,000.

There is no independent confirmation of either of these anecdotes.

Health
Like his father Lowther (a water drinker for his health's sake since at least 1701) suffered from gout, and from 1726 onwards he seems to have had a bad attack nearly every winter. In 1750, the attack was particularly severe and ensuing complications led to the amputation of his right leg. Lowther (just turned seventy-seven) survived the operation and (once the stump was healed, and wooden leg fitted) resumed his routine of spending nine months of the year in London (maintaining effective control of his mines by frequent correspondence with his steward) but the summer in Whitehaven. He died in London early in January 1755 and was buried in Whitehaven in Holy Trinity church, which he had been instrumental in founding in 1715.

Provisions of will

In the autumn of 1754, John Wesley followed up a meeting with Lowther by writing him a letter admonishing him to be more generous in personal alms-giving, and to leave his wealth to a better cause than the continued support of the Lowther family name.

The substance of what I took the liberty to mention to you this morning was: You are on the borders of the grave, as well as I; shortly we must both appear before God. When it seemed to me, some months since, that my life was near an end, I was troubled that I had not dealt plainly with you. This you will permit me to do now, without any reserve, in the fear and in the presence of God.

I reverence you for your office as a magistrate; I believe you to be an honest, upright man; I love you for having protected an innocent people from their cruel and lawless oppressors.  But so much the more am I obliged to say (though I judge not; God is the judge), I fear you are covetous, that you love the world. And if you do, as sure as the Word of God is true, you are not in a state of salvation.

The substance of your answer was: That many people exhort others to charity from self-interest; that men of fortune must mind their fortune; that you cannot go about to look for poor people; that when you have seen them your-self, and relieved them, they were scarce ever satisfied; that many make an ill use of what you give them; that you cannot trust the account people give of themselves by letters; that nevertheless you do give to private persons by the hands of Colonel Hudson and others; that you have also given to several hospitals an hundred pounds at a time, but that you must support your family; that the Lowther family has continued above four hundred years; that you are for great things -- for public charities and for saving the nation from ruin; and that others may think as they please, but this is your way of thinking, and has been for many years...
Is not death at hand? And are not you and I just stepping into eternity? Are we not just going to appear in the presence of God, and that naked of all worldly goods ? Will you then rejoice in the money you have left behind you? or in that you have given to support a family, as it is called -- that is, in truth, to support the pride and vanity and luxury which you have yourself despised all your life long?
Despite Wesley's admonitions, Lowther divided his estates and property largely among other Lowther baronets (although a thousand pounds was left to John Spedding, and five hundred pounds to Carlisle Spedding).

The late Sir James Lowther has left the Bulk of his great Fortune, amounting to near £600,000 to the two Baronets of his name, distant relations.  His Estate in Cumberland, with the Coal-Mines, which produce £15,000 per Annum to Sir William Lowther [of Marske], Bart. His Estates in Westmoreland and Middlesex, with his Stocks, Mortgages, &c, to a great Value to Sir James Lowther [of Lowther].

Sir William died in 1756 and the properties he had inherited from Sir James Lowther of Whitehaven passed to Sir James Lowther of Lowther (Wicked Jimmy), with whom he is sometimes confused.

Works
 was presented by Lowther but without any explicit claim to authorship: probably written by Carlisle Spedding.

Notes

References

|-

1673 births
1755 deaths
Alumni of The Queen's College, Oxford
British businesspeople in the coal industry
Baronets in the Baronetage of England
Fellows of the Royal Society
Members of the Parliament of Great Britain for English constituencies
Members of the Privy Council of Great Britain
British MPs 1708–1710
British MPs 1710–1713
British MPs 1713–1715
British MPs 1715–1722
British MPs 1722–1727
British MPs 1727–1734
British MPs 1734–1741
British MPs 1741–1747
British MPs 1747–1754
British MPs 1754–1761
English landowners
James
English MPs 1690–1695
English MPs 1695–1698
English MPs 1698–1700
English MPs 1701
English MPs 1701–1702
18th-century English businesspeople